The Finnish VR Class Tk3 (original classification 'K5') was a 2-8-0 light freight locomotive. It was the most numerous steam locomotive class in Finland with 161 built. 100 locomotives were constructed between 1927 and 1930, with a further 61 ordered and constructed 1943–53.  They were numbered 800–899, 1100–1118, and 1129–1170.

They were designed for a low axle load of just . This allowed them to operate on lightly laid secondary lines, but during their many years of service, up to the end of the steam era, they were also widely used on main lines hauling slow passenger trains that made frequent stops.

They were affectionately called "Pikku-Jumbo" (The Little Jumbo) because of their good performance despite their low weight. They had a low fuel consumption (usually Tk3s used birch wood) and good riding characteristics. They also had good steaming characteristics and were very popular among locomotive crews.

The livery of Tk3 was the same as other VR steam locomotives: dark locomotive green with a black smokebox. When new some locos were lined with thin gold decoration. The gold decorations were not repainted during maintenance, so they were seldom seen.

Two Tk3-type engines were originally supplied by Tampella to Rauma Rautatie as Nos. 9 and 10 (ex-No. 8) in 1935 and 1927 respectively. These engines became Tk3 1117 and 1118 after the private railway was absorbed by the State network in 1950.

Preservation

Thirty-eight members of the class have been preserved:

852 Pieksämäki
859 Kouvola railway station, Kouvola
1100
1103 Retallack Leisure Centre & Holiday Park, Cornwall, UK. 
1104 Haapamäki
1105 Russian Railway Museum, Baltiysky railway station, St.Petersburg
1106 Parola
1108 Turku 
1110
1111 Haapamäki
1112 Vaala
1129
1130 Haapamäki
1132 Porvoo
1134 Acton, Suffolk, England
1135 Haapamäki
1136 Haapamäki
1137  
1138 Suolahti
1139 Haapamäki
1140 Tampere
1141  
1142 Haapamäki
1144 Bressingham Steam and Gardens, England
1146 Haapamäki 
1147 Rovaniemi
1148 Rovaniemi
1150 Suolahti
1151 England
1152 Ämmänsaari, Suomussalmi
1154 Commercial center Veturi, Kouvola, Tk3
1157 Acton, Suffolk, England
1159 Kokkola
1163 Pasila
1165 Seinäjoki
1167 Rauma, Finland
1168 Porvoo
1170 Karis

Gallery

See also 

 Finnish Railway Museum
 History of rail transport in Finland
 Heritage railways
 Jokioinen Museum Railway
 List of Finnish locomotives
 List of heritage railways
 List of railway museums
 Restored trains
 VR Class Pr1
 VR Class Hr1
 VR Class Hr11
 VR Group

References

Literature 
Valtionrautatiet 1937-1962, Helsinki 1962

Tampella locomotives
Tk3
2-8-0 locomotives
Railway locomotives introduced in 1927
Tk3
5 ft gauge locomotives